Žeje may refer to a number of settlements in Slovenia:

 Žeje, Domžale, a settlement in the Municipality of Domžale central Slovenia
 Žeje, Naklo,  a settlement in the Municipality of Naklo, northwestern Slovenia
 Žeje, Postojna, a settlement in the Municipality of Postojna, southwestern Slovenia
 Žeje pri Komendi, a settlement in the Municipality of Komenda, central Slovenia